Filippo Gemmi (born 21 June 1997) is an Italian footballer who plays for Calcio Foggia 1920 S.S.D. as a midfielder.

Club career
On 31 January 2019, he joined Olbia on loan.

On 20 August 2019, he signed with Foggia.

References

External links

1997 births
Living people
Association football midfielders
Italian footballers
Serie C players
Serie D players
U.S. Livorno 1915 players
Olbia Calcio 1905 players
Calcio Foggia 1920 players